Jerry Lane Stovall  (born April 30, 1941) is a former American football player, coach, and college athletics administrator. He played college football at Louisiana State University (LSU), where he was a unanimous selection to the 1962 College Football All-America Team as a halfback. Stovall played professionally as a defensive back and punter in the National Football League (NFL) with the St. Louis Cardinals from 1963 to 1971. Stovall served as the head football coach at his alma mater, LSU, from 1980 to 1983, compiling a record of 22–21–2 in four seasons and leading the 1982 team to an appearance in the 1983 Orange Bowl. He was the athletic director at Louisiana Tech University from 1990 to 1993. He is the only player in LSU history to be named a Unanimous All-American (1962), be selected to the college football hall of fame (2010), be selected as a first round pick (1963), and to be selected to the pro bowl (1966, 1967, and 1969).

Early life and college
Born and raised in West Monroe, Louisiana, Stovall graduated from West Monroe High School in 1959. He played college football at Louisiana State University (LSU) in Baton Rouge, succeeding Heisman Trophy winner Billy Cannon as the Tigers' halfback. Stovall served a multitude of roles for the Tigers, including running back, defensive back, return specialist, and punter. His primary position was left halfback, which in the days of one-platoon football was both a running back and defensive back.

His 57-yard run in 1961 helped LSU defeat arch-rival Ole Miss by a score of 10–7 in a major upset.

Stovall was a unanimous choice for the All-America team of 1962 at halfback. He won the Walter Camp Memorial Trophy as the nation's best back, was named SEC Player of the Year, and was the runner-up for the Heisman Trophy. He finished 89 votes behind Oregon State's Terry Baker.

Professional career
Stovall was the second overall pick in the 1963 NFL draft, selected by the St. Louis Cardinals. He was also the third overall pick of the 1963 American Football League draft. The Cardinals converted him to full-time defensive back. He was regarded as one of the top rookies in the league in 1963. During his nine seasons with St. Louis, Stovall had 18 interceptions in 97 games, and was selected to the Pro Bowl after the 1966, 1967, and 1969 seasons.

Coaching career
After his NFL career, Stovall became a college football assistant coach. He eventually returned to LSU, as an assistant for head coach Charlie McClendon. Stovall became LSU's head coach as an emergency hire after new head coach Bo Rein died when his plane depressurized and disappeared over the Atlantic Ocean.

In Stovall's four years with the Tigers (1980–1983), LSU finished 7–4, 3–7–1, 8–3–1, and 4–7. Only one of Stovall's teams appeared in the final AP Poll: the 1982 team. That team finished the season ranked No. 11 after it beat No. 4 Florida, No. 8 Alabama, and No. 7 Florida State and earned a spot in the Orange Bowl, where LSU lost, 21–20, to a No. 3 Nebraska team led by Tom Osborne. As a result of his performance in 1982, Stovall was named the national coach of the year by the Walter Camp Football Foundation, as well as the SEC Coach of the Year.

In 1983, Stovall's success of 1982 came unraveled. The Tigers went 0–6 in the SEC, including a 45–26 loss at home to Mississippi State, leaving Stovall 0–4 for his career against the Bulldogs.

Stovall had a 2–2 record against Tulane. To date, the Tigers have only lost to Tulane on two other occasions since 1948, both under McClendon. After the Tigers had secured the Orange Bowl berth in 1982, they suffered their only home loss to Tulane since 1948. The Tigers have won 18 in a row in the series since but has only played the Green Wave six times since 1994, typically winning by comfortable margins.

Stovall's dismissal by athletic director Bob Brodhead was approved by the LSU Board of Supervisors on December 2, 1983.

Administration
After his head coaching stint at LSU, Stovall went on to take a job in banking before becoming athletic director at Louisiana Tech University from 1990 to 1994. Afterwards, Stovall became the president and CEO of the Baton Rouge Area Sports Foundation, an organization dedicated to securing sporting events for the Baton Rouge area.

Head coaching record

References

External links
 
 

1941 births
Living people
American football defensive backs
American football halfbacks
American football punters
Louisiana Tech Bulldogs and Lady Techsters athletic directors
LSU Tigers football coaches
LSU Tigers football players
St. Louis Cardinals (football) players
All-American college football players
College Football Hall of Fame inductees
Eastern Conference Pro Bowl players
West Monroe High School alumni
Players of American football from Baton Rouge, Louisiana
People from West Monroe, Louisiana
Coaches of American football from Louisiana